The Urbana Pops Orchestra is a symphony orchestra based in Urbana, Illinois which focuses on both performance of orchestral pops music and education of local students.

Beginnings
The Urbana Pops Orchestra (or "UPO") was first conceived in late 2009 as an extension of Urbana Park District's summer youth theater pit orchestra.  The following year, Daniel F. Southerland and Stephen L. Larson co-founded a full orchestra from community members, high school students, and students at the University of Illinois. After a conductor, staff, and guild were formed, the orchestra rehearsed for the first time in June 2010 to prepare for its summer season.  Consequent rehearsals led to its first concert "Urbana Pops at the Movies" (June 2010) and "Urbana Pops Plays Broadway" (July 2010).  To conclude its first season, a reduced pit orchestra served as the music for summer 2010's Urbana Youth Theater production (in its original capacity) "Once Upon a Mattress."

Concerts
To date, the Urbana Pops Orchestra has presented the following concerts:

 June 2010 - Urbana Pops at the Movies
 July 2010 - Urbana Pops Plays Broadway
 July 2010 - Once Upon a Mattress with Summer Youth Theater
 December 2010 - Urbana Pops Celebrates the Holidays
 June 2011 - Around the World in 80 Minutes
 July 2011 - Made in the USA
 December 2011 - Holiday Brass (featuring a brass ensemble)
 June 2012 - Magical Tales
 July 2012 - Made in the USA
 June 2013 - That's No Moon
 July 2013 - Made in the USA
 June 2014 - Sounds of Adventure
 July 2014 - Made in the USA
 June 2015 - Once Upon a Tune
 June 2016 - Video Games
 July 2016 - Made in America
 June 2017 - Cartoons in Concert
 July 2017 - Made in America
 June 2018 - Showstoppers!
 June 2019 - Plays Well With Others

Orchestra Board
To help support for the UPO, the Urbana Pops Orchestra Board was formed in summer 2010 with the mission of fundraising, volunteer work, and marketing for the orchestra.

References

External links 
 Urbana Pops Orchestra
 UPO on Facebook

Pops orchestras
Musical groups established in 2010
Orchestras based in Illinois
Urbana, Illinois
2010 establishments in Illinois